Cephalodiscus australiensis is a sessile hemichordate belonging to the order Cephalodiscida.

References

australiensis